Devaryampettai is a village in the Papanasam taluk of Thanjavur district, Tamil Nadu, India.

Demographics 

As per the 2001 census, Devaryampettai had a total population of 851 with 440 males and 411 females. The sex ratio was 934. The literacy rate was 48.37.

References 

 

Villages in Thanjavur district